Pentila condamini, the Condamin's red pentila, is a butterfly in the family Lycaenidae. It is found in Senegal, Sierra Leone, Liberia and possibly western Ivory Coast.

References

Butterflies described in 1963
Poritiinae